The American Heart Journal is a monthly peer-reviewed medical journal covering all aspects of cardiology. It is published by Elsevier and the editor-in-chief is Daniel B. Mark (Durham, NC). The journal was established in 1925 and published bimonthly until 1977, when it switched to a monthly schedule.

Abstracting and indexing 
The journal is abstracted and indexed in Scopus, Science Citation Index, Current Contents/Clinical Medicine, Current Contents/Life Sciences, BIOSIS Previews, and Index Medicus/MEDLINE/PubMed. According to the Journal Citation Reports, the journal has a 2020 impact factor of 4.749, ranking it 46th out of 142 journals in the category "Cardiac & Cardiovascular Systems".

References

External links 
 

Cardiology journals
Elsevier academic journals
Monthly journals
English-language journals
Publications established in 1925